Kaye is an English and Irish surname (from the old English kaie and the Gaelic Mac Aodh). The surname is also a diminutive of MacKay and McKaye. Notable people with this surname include:

Music
 Carol Kaye, American electric bass player
 Charlene Kaye, American singer
 Dave Kaye, British pianist
 Florence Kaye, songwriter
 Judy Kaye, American actress and singer
 Lenny Kaye, musician
 Mary Kaye, American guitarist
 Sammy Kaye, American bandleader and songwriter
 Tony Kaye (musician), British keyboard player

Politics
 Frederick A. Kaye (1796–1866), fourth and sixth mayor of Louisville, Kentucky
 John Kaye (politician) (1955–2016), Australian academic and politician
 William Kaye (1813–1890), fourteenth mayor of Louisville, Kentucky
 Laurence "Loz" Kaye, former Leader of Pirate Party UK

Sports
 Alicia Kaye, Canadian/US professional triathlete
 James Kaye, British racing driver
 Jonathan Kaye (born 1970), professional golfer on PGA Tour
 Mark-Anthony Kaye (born 1994), Canadian soccer player
 Matthew Kaye, American professional wrestler
 Peter Kaye, English footballer

Television and film
 Celia Kaye, American actress
 Danny Kaye, American actor and comedian
 Darwood "Waldo" Kaye, American actor and minister
 David Kaye, Canadian voice actor
 Gorden Kaye, British actor
 Ivan Kaye, British actor
 Linda Kaye, American actress
 Norman Kaye, Australian actor
 Randi Kaye, investigative reporter for CNN
 Stubby Kaye, American comic actor
 Thorsten Kaye, German actor
 Tony Kaye (director), British film director

Literature
 M. M. Kaye, British novelist
 Marilyn Kaye, American children's author
 Sheila Kaye-Smith, British novelist

Other
 Sir Emmanuel Kaye, British businessman
 John William Kaye, British military historian
 John Lister-Kaye, British naturalist
 Jonathan Kaye (linguist), linguist
 Judith Kaye, American judge
 Martin Kaye (1919-1977), British Anglican priest
 Mel Kaye, programmer of legend
 Nora Kaye, American ballerina
 Otis Kaye, American artist 
 Paul Kaye, British comedian
 Wendy Kaye, American model

See also
 Kay (surname)

External links
 Possible Origins of Kaye

References

de:Kaye